Saat Saheliyan  is a 2010 Indian Bhojpuri-language film directed and produced by Rajkumar R. Pandey, starring Pradeep Pandey,  Dinesh Lal Yadav,  Rinku Ghosh, Pakkhi Hegde, Rani Chatterjee and Monalisa.

Cast

See also
Haft Peykar
Hasht-Bihisht

References

2010 films
Indian action films
2010s Hindi-language films
2010s Bhojpuri-language films
Films directed by Rajkumar R. Pandey
2010 action films